Tamarixia is a genus of hymenopteran insects of the family Eulophidae, they are parasitoids of Jumping plant lice or psyllids of the superfamily Psylloidea, although some species will parasitise aphids. Most species appear to be ectoparasitoids but at least one species has been recorded as an endoparasitoid.

Species
Tamarixia contains the following species:

 Tamarixia actis (Walker, 1839)
 Tamarixia akkumica (Kostjukov, 1978)
 Tamarixia arboreae (Graham, 1979)
 Tamarixia asiatica Kostjukov, 1996
 Tamarixia atamiensis (Ashmead, 1904)
 Tamarixia bicolor Mercet, 1924
 Tamarixia brovni Kostjukov, 2000
 Tamarixia caillardiae (Kostjukov, 1978)
 Tamarixia cometes (Girault, 1915)
 Tamarixia dahlsteni Zuparko, 2011
 Tamarixia dhetysaicus Kostjukov, 1996
 Tamarixia dryi (Waterston, 1922)
 Tamarixia dwivarnus Narendran, 2007
 Tamarixia dyra (Burks, 1943)
?Tamarixia erytreae Tamarixia flavicoxae Kostjukov, 2000)
 Tamarixia flavigaster (Brothers & Moran, 1969)
 Tamarixia flaviventris (Kostjukov, 1978)
 Tamarixia fulvus Yefremova & Yegorenkova, 2009
 Tamarixia girishi Narendran, 2007
 Tamarixia hanca Kostjukov, 2000
 Tamarixia klarisae Kostjukov, 1996
 Tamarixia krascheninnikovi (Kostjukov, 1990)
 Tamarixia leptothrix Graham, 1991
 Tamarixia leucaenae Boucek, 1988
 Tamarixia meteora (Girault, 1915)
 Tamarixia monesus (Walker, 1839)
 Tamarixia newelskoyi (Kostjukov, 1990)
 Tamarixia nocturna Kostjukov, 2000
 Tamarixia orientalis Khan, Agnihotri & Sushil, 2005
 Tamarixia pallicornis (Walker, 1872)
 Tamarixia poddubnyi (Kostjukov, 1978)
 Tamarixia pojarkovi (Kostjukov, 1990)
 Tamarixia pookodica Narendran, 2007
 Tamarixia pronomus (Walker, 1839)
 Tamarixia przewalskii (Kostjukov, 1990)
 Tamarixia psyllae Yefremova & Yegorenkova, 2009
 Tamarixia pubescens (Nees, 1834)
 Tamarixia pygmaeola (Erdos, 1958)
 Tamarixia radiata (Waterston, 1922)
 Tamarixia rudolfae (Kostjukov, 1978)
 Tamarixia schina Zuparko, 2011
 Tamarixia sheebae Narendran, 2005
 Tamarixia stelleri (Kostjukov, 1990)
 Tamarixia tremblayi (Domenichini, 1965)
 Tamarixia triozae (Burks, 1943)
 Tamarixia tschirikovi (Kostjukov, 1990)
 Tamarixia turundaevskayae (Kostjukov, 1978)
 Tamarixia upis (Walker, 1839)
 Tamarixia vinokurovi Kostjukov, 1995
 Tamarixia yoorica'' Narendran, 2007

References

 
Eulophidae